Janid may refer to:

 Janid Ortiz, known as Janid, is a Puerto Rican singer, songwriter, actress and reality TV star
 Janid dynasty of the Khanate of Bukhara, in the 17th and 18th centuries
 Janid Deraz, village in Sarjam Rural District, Iran